Ivan Hristov may refer to:

 Ivan Hristov (canoeist) (born 1982), Bulgarian canoeist
 Ivan Hristov (writer) (born 1978), Bulgarian poet and critic
 Ivan Hristov (footballer) (born 1977), Bulgarian football player